Lars-Ivar Ericson (born 23 July 1948) is a Swedish politician. He is a member of the Centre Party. He was a member of the Riksdag from 2002 until 2010.

References

1948 births
Living people
Members of the Riksdag 2002–2006
Members of the Riksdag 2006–2010
Members of the Riksdag from the Centre Party (Sweden)
Place of birth missing (living people)